The Ministry of Culture, Tourism and Civil Aviation (MoCTCA) is the governmental body for promoting tourism, culture and private sector involvement in Nepal. It also serves as the Nepalese aviation regulatory body. The ministry is located in Singha Durbar, Kathmandu.

History
The Ministry of Tourism was established in 1978 by the Government of Nepal. The portfolios of Civil Aviation and Culture were added in 1982 and 2000 respectively. This structure was dissolved again in 2008, when the ministry was split into the Ministry of Tourism and Civil Aviation on the one side and the Ministry of Culture and State Restructuring on the other side. In 2012, the ministry was again renamed and gained its current form as the Ministry of Culture, Tourism and Civil Aviation.

Organisational structure
The Ministry of Culture, Tourism and Civil Aviation has several departments and subdivisions: 
 Civil Aviation Authority of Nepal
 Department of Archaeology
 Nepal Airlines Corporation
 National Lake Conservation Development Committee
 Aviation Security Division
 Department of Tourism
 Nepal Academy of Tourism and Hotel Management (NATHM)
 Nepal Tourism Board

Former Ministers of Culture, Tourism and Civil Aviation
This is a list of former Ministers of Culture, Tourism and Civil Aviation since the Nepalese Constituent Assembly election in 2013:

References

External links
 

 and 

Nepal, Culture, Tourism and Civil Aviation
Nepal, Culture, Tourism and Civil Aviation
Culture, Tourism and Civil Aviation
1978 establishments in Nepal